This is a list of diplomatic missions of Saint Kitts and Nevis, which operate under the authority of the Kittitian Ministry of Foreign Affairs. The Caribbean island of Saint Kitts and Nevis has a modest diplomatic presence. Its embassy and mission to the European Union in Brussels and its embassy in Morocco is shared with other East Caribbean states. It recognizes the Republic of China and consequently has an embassy in Taipei.

Africa

 Rabat (Embassy)

Americas

 Ottawa (High Commission)

 Havana (Embassy)

 Washington, D.C. (Embassy)
 Los Angeles (Consulate-General)
 New York City (Consulate-General)

Asia

 Taipei (Embassy)

 Abu Dhabi (Embassy)

Europe

 Brussels (Embassy)

 London (High Commission)

Multilateral organisations
 
Brussels (Mission)
 
New York City (Permanent Mission)

Gallery

See also
 Foreign relations of Saint Kitts and Nevis
 Ministry of Foreign Affairs (Saint Kitts and Nevis)

References
 Ministry of Foreign Affairs of Saint Kitts and Nevis: Missions Located Overseas

Diplomatic missions
Saint Kitts and Nevis